Sala Sporturilor Târgu Mureș  is an indoor arena in Târgu Mureș, Romania. Its best known tenant is the basketball club BC Mureș.

References

Târgu Mureș
Indoor arenas in Romania
Basketball venues in Romania